Judo at the 1996 Summer Paralympics consisted of seven men's events.

Medal table

Participating nations

Medal summary

See also 
Judo at the 1996 Summer Olympics

References 

 

1996 Summer Paralympics events
1996
Paralympics
Judo competitions in the United States